The following is an overview of the events of 1898 in film, including a list of films released and notable births. The Spanish–American War was a popular subject. Several films made by Col. William N. Selig dealt with the subject of war preparations at Camp Tanner in Springfield, Illinois, including Soldiers at Play, Wash Day in Camp and First Regiment Marching. 



Events
May 19 – Vitagraph is founded in New York.
August 27 – Alfred John West gives a Royal Command Performance to Queen Victoria of film from the cruise of HMS Crescent at Osborne House.
Birt Acres invents the first amateur format, Birtac, by splitting 35 mm film into two halves of 17.5 mm.

Films released in 1898
 The Accursed Cavern, directed by George Melies 
The Astronomer's Dream, directed by Georges Méliès; re-released in 1899 as A Trip to the Moon
The Ball Game
The Cavalier's Dream, directed by Edwin S. Porter
 The Cave of the Demons,  directed by George Melies
Come Along, Do!, directed by Robert W. Paul.  First multi-scene film in cinema [In this film 2 scenes are edited together for the first time in cinema]
Corbett and Sharkey Fight
 The Corsican Brothers, produced by G.A.S. Films (British)
 The Damnation of Faust,  directed by George Melies
Dewar's It's Scotch, the first advertising movie, produced by the Edison Studios
Don Juan Tenorio, the first Mexican film with a plot, directed by Salvador Toscano
Eiffel Tower, directed by Louis Lumière.  First (sort of) crane shot in cinema [It was taken from the ascending elevator in the Eiffel Tower]
 Ella Lola, a la Trilby, produced by the Edison Co.
 Faust and Mephistopheles, directed by George Albert Smith
The Four Troublesome Heads, directed by Georges Méliès
The Humpty Dumpty Circus, directed by J. Stuart Blackton
 Jizo the Spook, Japanese (aka Bake Jizo)
The Magician, directed by Georges Méliès
 The Mesmerist, directed by George Albert Smith. 
The Miller and the Sweep, directed by George Albert Smith
The Nearsighted School Teacher 
 A Novice at X-Rays, directed by George Melies
Pack Train On Chilkoot Pass, film shows landscape in Chilkoot Pass, Alaska or British Columbia
Photographing a Ghost, directed by George Albert Smith
Santa Claus, directed by George Albert Smith. May include the first example of parallel action in a motion picture
 Shinen no sosei (aka Resurrection of a Ghost), Japanese
Smích a pláč (Laugh and Tears), directed by Josef Šváb-Malostranský, the first Czech film
Surrender of General Toral
A Switchback Railway

Debuts
Josef Šváb-Malostranský
 Johnston Forbes-Robertson – Macbeth
Salvador Toscano

Births

Date unknown 
Monang Carvajal, Filipina actress (died 1980)

External links

References

 
Film by year